Ĝatumdug was a Sumerian goddess worshiped in Lagash. The meaning of her name is unknown.

She was described as the mother of the city-state of Lagash, or as its divine founder. According to inscriptions of Gudea she assigned a lamma (tutelary protective deity) to him.  

The early king Ur-Nanshe built a temple dedicated to her. Some of the later Lagashite kings, notably Enanatum I and Enmetena, designated her as their divine mother, though sometimes this role was fulfilled by a different local goddess, Bau, instead (as in the case of Eanatum, Lugalanda and Urukagina). It's possible both goddesses were later synretised.

She continued to be worshiped during the reign of the Third Dynasty of Ur, and documents list offerings of butter, cheese, flour and dates to her.

References

Bibliography 

Mesopotamian goddesses
Mother goddesses
Tutelary deities